Kristine Bayley (born 22 June 1983 in Perth) is an Australian professional track cyclist.

Her brother, Ryan Bayley, is also a professional cyclist.

Her engagement to Shane Perkins, another international track cyclist, was announced in spring 2008. They were married in November 2009.

Palmarès 

2004
3rd Team Sprint, World Cup, Manchester
2005
Australian National Track Championships
3rd 500 m
2nd Keirin
 2006
Australian National Track Championships
1st 500 m, Elite
3rd Team Sprint
Oceania Games
1st 500 m
2nd Sprint
3rd Keirin
2007
Australian National Track Championships
2nd 500 m
3rd Team Sprint
3rd Sprint
3rd Keirin
3rd Team Sprint, World Cup, Manchester
3rd Team Sprint, World Championships (with Anna Meares)

References

External links 
 

1983 births
Living people
Australian female cyclists
Australian track cyclists
Sportswomen from Western Australia
Cyclists from Perth, Western Australia